Maurice "Moe" Mitchell is an American activist and musician, currently serving as the National Director of the Working Families Party, a progressive political party known for cross-endorsing candidates through fusion voting. Mitchell has served in the role since April 2018, having succeeded Dan Cantor.

Early life and education 
Mitchell was born and raised in Long Beach, New York, the son of Caribbean immigrants. In high school, Mitchell was a member of the Long Island Student Coalition for Peace and Justice. Mitchell earned a Bachelor of Science degree in political science from Howard University.

Career 
After college, Mitchell returned to Long Island, where he worked at for the Long Island Progressive Coalition. Mitchell then worked as an organizing director for Citizen Action. During the Ferguson unrest after the shooting of Michael Brown, Mitchell temporarily relocated to Ferguson, Missouri to work with other activists.

In addition to his work in activism and political organizing, Mitchell is a founding member of the hardcore punk band, Cipher, established by Mitchell and several high school classmates in 1996.

In 2020, as a result of the COVID-19 pandemic, Mitchell and the Working Families Party had to recall waves of organizers and canvassers.

Personal life 
In 2012, Mitchell's home in Long Beach, New York was destroyed during Hurricane Sandy. Mitchell is vegan.

MF DOOM (Daniel Dumile) and DJ Subroc (Dingilizwe Dumile), legendary MC's/rappers, were Mitchell's older cousins.

References 

Working Families Party politicians
Living people
People from Long Beach, New York
Howard University alumni
Year of birth missing (living people)